Simon Alexander West (born 17 July 1961) is an English film director and producer. He has primarily worked in the action genre, most notably as the director of the films Con Air, Lara Croft: Tomb Raider, The Mechanic, and The Expendables 2. Outside of action, he also directed the films The General's Daughter and When a Stranger Calls. Prior to his film career, West served as the director for music videos, including "Never Gonna Give You Up" by Rick Astley.

Early life
West was born in Letchworth, Hertfordshire. He began his career as an assistant film editor with the BBC Film Department, where he worked on dramas and documentaries. He then left the BBC to work on commercials and music videos. His daughter Lillie West of the band Lala Lala described the experience being a filmmaker's daughter to Paper Magazine in a 2018 interview, “My dad is a filmmaker, and he has filmed pretty much every moment of my life from when I was born.”

Career

1990s  
West's directorial debut in 1997 with Con Air, starring Nicolas Cage, John Cusack, and John Malkovich.

2000s 
West directed the 2001 action film, Lara Croft: Tomb Raider. Although it's an adaptation of the popular video game Tomb Raider, the development of the film was influenced by a market that "wasn't used to women leading summer blockbusters" (with the exception of the Alien film series). This factor influenced his decision to cast Angelina Jolie as Croft, though she was not well known (she was not the studio's first choice, in contrast to Catherine Zeta-Jones, Ashley Judd, and Jennifer Lopez). While Lara Croft led to box office totals that were the highest for a female-led action film at that time, ($131 million), inspired theme park rides, led to a sequel, and made a star of Jolie, West was disappointed that it did not lead to similar films. He noted that "at the time, the studio was incredibly nervous at what the outcome could have been. I’m surprised it's taken so long [for other female-fronted action stories to rise up], because I thought that two or three years after, there’d be 10 other movies like it cashing in on its success ...[b]ut it's amazing how things work so slowly. But finally The Hunger Games and Patty Jenkins’ Wonder Woman have caught up!" 

Joey Nolfi (Entertainment Weekly) states that West "molded his heroine – never bogged down by romantic subplots – as a badass genre role model for girls, with more scenes of assured tomb raiding and less overt sexuality" (West notes to have done so would have "probably would’ve been the death of the film and the character"). Critic Cristina Lucia Stasia also argues that the film Lara Croft distinguished itself from other popular "girl power" shows and films of the same period: The Matrix (1999), Charles Angels (2000), Crouching Tiger, Hidden Dragon (2000), Dark Angel (2000), and Alias (2001). She suggests that this was due to the fact that "Simon West, the director of Tomb Raider, foregrounds [a] tension between female sexuality and female action heroes when he argues that ‘Angelina should be a role model for action actors. We turned her into something you wouldn't want to meet in a dark alley – but then again you would."

2010s-present 

West would eventually work on a number of action films including the 2012 film Expendables 2 with Sylvester Stallone, Jet Li, Chuck Norris, Jean-Claude Van Damme, Bruce Willis, and Arnold Schwarzenegger. He also reunited with Nicolas Cage in 2012 for Stolen. In 2015, he directed the crime thriller film Wild Card with Jason Statham. It is a remake of the 1986 film Heat, based on the novel of the same name by William Goldman. In 2017 West directed his first feature musical comedy Gun Shy starring Antonio Banderas and based on the novel Salty by Mark Haskhell Smith. West directed the 2019 big-budget disaster movie from China, Skyfire, and will also direct another Chinese action film, The Legend Hunters.

Filmography

Films 
Director

Executive producer
 Black Hawk Down (2001)

Producer
 Night of the Living Dead: Darkest Dawn (2015)

Television
Director

Executive producer
 The Saint (2017) (TV movie)

Music videos

References

External links

Simon West Biography – Apple TV
The nail-biting life of an action film director, Fortune, 12 July 2012.

1961 births
American television directors
English film directors
English television directors
English film producers
Living people
People educated at Fearnhill School
People from Letchworth
Action film directors